Barolineocerus chiasmus is a species of leafhopper native to French Guiana. It is named for the thin, sword-like protrusion on the last segment of the abdomen on the male. It is distinguished from other species in the genus on the basis of the aforementioned protrusion.

References

Insects described in 2008
Hemiptera of South America
Eurymelinae